The 1985 World Orienteering Championships, the 11th World Orienteering Championships, were held in Bendigo, Australia, 4–6 September 1985.

The championships had four events; individual contests for men and women, and relays for men and women.

Medalists

Results

Men's individual

Women's individual

References 

World Orienteering Championships
1985 in Australian sport
International sports competitions hosted by Australia
September 1985 sports events in Australia
Orienteering in Australia
Sports competitions in Victoria (Australia)
1980s in Victoria (Australia)